Dr. Alton Gold Keel Jr. (born September 15, 1943) is an American engineer, government official, diplomat, and businessman.

Keel attended the University of Virginia, where he earned a bachelor of science in aerospace engineering in 1966 and a Ph.D. in 1970.  He performed weapons research at the Naval Surface Weapons Center, and then joined the staff of the United States Senate, where he was a Congressional science fellow (1976–78) and a staff member of the Senate Armed Services Committee (1978–81).  He then served as Assistant Secretary of the Air Force (Acquisition) (1981–82) and Associate Director of the Office of Management and Budget (1982–86).  In 1986, he was appointed Executive Director of the Rogers Commission that investigated the Space Shuttle Challenger Disaster.

In July 1986, President Ronald Reagan appointed Keel as the acting principal deputy to the National Security Advisor.  From 1987-89, Keel was the United States Permanent Representative to NATO.

Keel has held various positions in corporate governance, and as of 2007 was president and managing director of Atlantic Partners LLC, a private investment-banking group.

References
 White House announcement of Keel's appointment as deputy National Security Adviser, July 15, 1986
 Josie Loyd, "Ambassador Alton G. Keel Jr. Speaks to the Newest Jeffersonian Engineers", U.Va. Engineer, spring 2007.
 U.S. NATO Mission website

1943 births
Living people
University of Virginia School of Engineering and Applied Science alumni
United States Air Force civilians
Permanent Representatives of the United States to NATO
Reagan administration personnel
George H. W. Bush administration personnel
American aerospace engineers